Morphology is a peer-reviewed academic journal in linguistic morphology published by the Springer Netherlands since 2006. Its editors-in-chief are Ingo Plag, Olivier Bonami and Ana R. Luís. The previous volumes were published under the title Yearbook of Morphology edited by Geert Booij.

References

External links
Official website

Linguistic morphology journals
Springer Science+Business Media academic journals
Quarterly journals
English-language journals
Publications established in 2006